La Presa (Spanish for "The Dam") is a census-designated place (CDP) in the East County region of San Diego County, California, United States.  The population was 34,169 at the 2010 census, up from 32,721 at the 2000 census.

La Presa belonged to the neighboring Spring Valley CDP from its inception in 1970 through 1990. It is still considered part of Spring Valley in informal usage and addresses in the CDP continue to use the name Spring Valley. It was named after the Sweetwater Dam.

La Presa is served by a 91977 ZIP code, which is considered Spring Valley according to the USPS.

Geography
La Presa is located at  (32.712057, -117.003862).

Demographics

2010
At the 2010 census La Presa had a population of 34,169. The racial makeup of La Presa was 9,045 (24.0%) White, 4,428 (13.0%) African American, 282 (0.8%) Native American, 3,958 (10.5%) Asian, 410 (1.2%) Pacific Islander, 8,238 (24.1%) from other races, and 2,535 (7.4%) from two or more races. Hispanic or Latino of any race were 19,279 persons (51.1%).

The census reported that 33,924 people (99.3% of the population) lived in households, 154 (0.5%) lived in non-institutionalized group quarters, and 91 (0.3%) were institutionalized.

There were 10,178 households, 4,708 (46.3%) had children under the age of 18 living in them, 5,270 (51.8%) were opposite-sex married couples living together, 1,885 (18.5%) had a female householder with no husband present, 784 (7.7%) had a male householder with no wife present.  There were 640 (6.3%) unmarried opposite-sex partnerships, and 85 (0.8%) same-sex married couples or partnerships. 1,625 households (16.0%) were one person and 705 (6.9%) had someone living alone who was 65 or older. The average household size was 3.33.  There were 7,939 families (78.0% of households); the average family size was 3.69.

The age distribution was 9,584 people (28.0%) under the age of 18, 3,692 people (10.8%) aged 18 to 24, 9,287 people (27.2%) aged 25 to 44, 8,015 people (23.5%) aged 45 to 64, and 3,591 people (10.5%) who were 65 or older.  The median age was 32.7 years. For every 100 females, there were 95.9 males.  For every 100 females age 18 and over, there were 92.1 males.

There were 10,711 housing units at an average density of 1,780.0 per square mile, of the occupied units 6,338 (62.3%) were owner-occupied and 3,840 (37.7%) were rented. The homeowner vacancy rate was 2.2%; the rental vacancy rate was 5.7%.  20,565 people (60.2% of the population) lived in owner-occupied housing units and 13,359 people (39.1%) lived in rental housing units.

2000
At the 2000 census there were 32,721 people, 10,008 households, and 7,986 families in the CDP. The population density was 5,843.6 inhabitants per square mile (2,256.0/km). The racial makeup of the CDP was  25.6% White, 14.5% African American, 0.9% Native American, 9.8% Asian, 1.1% Pacific Islander, 16.4% from other races, and 7.1% from two or more races. Hispanic or Latino of any race were 51.1%.

Of the 10,008 households 43.5% had children under the age of 18 living with them, 57.6% were married couples living together, 16.5% had a female householder with no husband present, and 20.2% were non-families. 14.6% of households were one person and 5.8% were one person aged 65 or older.  The average household size was 3.25 and the average family size was 3.55.

The age distribution was 31.3% under the age of 18, 9.3% from 18 to 24, 30.5% from 25 to 44, 19.6% from 45 to 64, and 9.3% 65 or older.  The median age was 32 years. For every 100 females, there were 95.2 males.  For every 100 females age 18 and over, there were 91.3 males.

The median household income was $45,939 and the median family income  was $47,486. Males had a median income of $34,412 versus $26,210 for females. The per capita income for the CDP was $15,998.  About 9.4% of families and 10.7% of the population were below the poverty line, including 15.5% of those under age 18 and 6.4% of those age 65 or over.

Government

References

External links
 Information on La Presa from city-data.com

Census-designated places in San Diego County, California
East County (San Diego County)
Census-designated places in California